Sweet Dreams is the 1985 soundtrack album to the movie of the same name, starring Jessica Lange and Ed Harris about the life of country music star, Patsy Cline. The soundtrack's music contained all original songs by Patsy Cline.

The album was released following the movie. Patsy Cline's original producer, legendary Nashville producer Owen Bradley produced the soundtrack. Cline's original vocals on half of the selections, including Walkin' After Midnight were overdubbed on new orchestrations for the film soundtrack. The music was remixed by Doug Crider at Music City Music Hall in Nashville, Tennessee. The overdub recording sessions took place in 1984 at Bradley's Barn in Mount Juliet, Tennessee. Originally released on LP, the soundtrack was later reissued in CD format later in 1990. The lead single from the soundtrack, "Sweet Dreams" was re-released in 1985 after being a big hit for Cline in 1963 and the film's soundtrack album itself charted at #6 on the Billboard Top Country Albums chart in 1985. David Hepworth in Q Magazine described it as "a more than reasonable introduction to Cline's work".

In April 1987, Sweet Dreams was certified Gold by the RIAA for shipments of over 500,000 copies in the United States.

Track listing
Side 1:
"San Antonio Rose" — (Bob Wills) 2:20
Overdubbed
"Seven Lonely Days" — (Marshall Brown, Alden Shuman, Earl Shuman) 2:14
Overdubbed
"Your Cheatin' Heart" — (Hank Williams) 2:21
Overdubbed
"Lovesick Blues" — (Hank Williams) 2:18
"Walkin' After Midnight" — (Alan Block, Don Hecht) 2:01
Overdubbed
"Foolin' 'Round" — (Harlan Howard, Buck Owens) 2:11
Overdubbed

Side 2:
"Half as Much" — (Curley Williams) 2:48
Overdubbed
"I Fall to Pieces" — (Hank Cochran, Harlan Howard) 2:46
"Crazy" — (Willie Nelson) 2:41
"Blue Moon of Kentucky" — (Bill Monroe) 2:02
Overdubbed
"She's Got You" — (Hank Cochran) 2:58
"Sweet Dreams (Of You)" — (Don Gibson) 2:33

Personnel

 Byron Bach — cello
 Brenton Banks — violin
 George Binkley III — violin
 Roger Bissell — trombone
 Milan Bogodan — tape preparation
 Harold Bradley — guitar
 Owen Bradley — guitar, producer
 David Briggs — piano
 Cecil Brower — violin
 Cole Burgess — alto saxophone
 James Capps — electric guitar
 Jimmy Capp — electric guitar
 Howard Carpenter — violin
 Gene Chrisman — drums
 Patsy Cline — lead vocals
 Floyd Cramer — piano
 Doug Crider — remixing, remastering
 Jimmy Day — steel guitar
 Ray Edenton — guitar
 Solie Fott — violin
 Hank Garland — guitar
 Barry Green — trombone
 Buddy Harman — drums, tom tom
 Walter Haynes — steel guitar
 Randy Hughes — guitar
 Lillian Hunt — violin
 Tommy Jackson — fiddle
 Ben Keith — steel guitar
 Ron Keller — trumpet
 Douglas Kirkham — drums

 Sam Levine — saxophone
 Grady Martin — guitar
 Glenn Meadows — remastering, tape preparation
 Joe Mills — assistant engineer
 Bob Moore — bass
 Billy Puett — saxophone
 Bill Pursell — organ, vibraphone
 Verna Richardson — violin
 Hargus Pig Robbins — piano
 Paul Ross — piano
 Hal Rugg — steel guitar
 Don Sheffield — trumpet
 Buddy Skipper — saxophone
 Dennis Sole — saxophone
 Buddy Spicher — fiddle
 Gordon Stoker — vocals
 Henry Strzelecki — bass
 George Todwell — trumpet
 Wilda Tinsley — violin
 Bill Vandevort — engineer
 Pete Wade — electric guitar
 Gary Williams — violin

Background vocals
 Arleen Harden
 Bobby Harden
 Hoyt Hawkins
 The Jordanaires
 Neal Matthews
 Ray C. Walker
 Curtis Young

Charts

Weekly charts

Year-end charts

References

Biographical film soundtracks
Albums produced by Owen Bradley
Patsy Cline albums
1985 soundtrack albums
MCA Records soundtracks